Saiid Paulson Adebo (born July 3, 1999) is an American football cornerback for the New Orleans Saints of the National Football League (NFL). He played college football at Stanford and was drafted by the Saints in the third round of the 2021 NFL Draft.

Early years
Adebo attended Mansfield High School in Mansfield, Texas. He played defensive back and wide receiver in high school. He originally committed to the University of Notre Dame to play college football but changed to Stanford University.

College career
After not appearing in any games his first year at Stanford in 2017, Adebo played in 13 games with 12 starts in 2018. He finished the season with 64 tackles and four interceptions. He returned as a starter in 2019.  During his junior season, Adebo had 33 tackles, 10 pass breakups, and 4 interceptions.  Despite speculation that he would declare for the 2020 NFL Draft, and being listed as the number 2 draft-eligible cornerback by Mel Kiper, Adebo announced that he would return to Stanford for his senior year.

Professional career

Adebo was drafted in the third round (76th overall) of the 2021 NFL Draft by the New Orleans Saints. He signed his four-year rookie contract with New Orleans on June 8, 2021.

2021 season: Rookie year

Heading into his first training camp in the NFL, Adebo was a starting cornerback alongside Marshon Lattimore.  However, he also faced minor competition from Patrick Robinson, Brian Poole, Prince Amukamara, Grant Haley, P. J. Williams, and Ken Crawley.  At the conclusion of the 2021 NFL preseason, head coach Sean Payton officially named Lattimore and Adebo the starting cornerbacks to begin the season. 

Adebo made his first career start and NFL regular-season debut in the Saints' 38-3 Week 1 victory against the Green Bay Packers.  He posted an impressive debut, recording two solo tackles, a pass defensed, and his first career interception off of Packers starting quarterback Aaron Rodgers while playing in 100% of the Saints' defensive snaps.  The following week against the Carolina Panthers, Adebo recorded six solo tackles as the Saints lost the game 26-7.  In Week 3 against the New England Patriots, Adebo recorded five solo tackles as the Saints won the game 28-13.  Two weeks later in a 33-22 victory against the Washington Football Team, Adebo recorded his second career interception off of Washington quarterback Taylor Heinicke, while also breaking up a pass and recording four solo tackles.  Adebo notched another pass break-up against the Seattle Seahawks in a Week 7 13-10 victory.  In the Saints' Week 11 loss against the Philadelphia Eagles, Adebo recorded four solo tackles while having a rough game overall.  He rebounded in the Saints' 30-9 Week 14 victory against the New York Jets, posting six solo tackles and a pass defensed.  Adebo once again recorded another pass defensed in the Saints' 9-0 victory against the Tampa Bay Buccaneers while almost recording an interception Buccaneers starting quarterback Tom Brady.  It marked the first time in 15 years that Brady was shut out by another team.  In the Saints' Week 17 victory against the Carolina Panthers, Adebo posted five solo tackles and another pass defensed.  Finally, in the Saints' Week 18 season finale victory against the Atlanta Falcons, Adebo recorded five solo tackles, two passes defensed, and his third career interception off of Falcons starting quarterback Matt Ryan.  

Adebo started in all 17 games as a rookie and finished his rookie season with 66 solo tackles, three interceptions, and eight passes defensed while appearing in 850 (76%) of the team's defensive snaps.

NFL Career statistics

Regular season

References

External links
Stanford Cardinal bio

Living people
American football cornerbacks
People from Mansfield, Texas
Players of American football from Texas
Sportspeople from the Dallas–Fort Worth metroplex
Stanford Cardinal football players
New Orleans Saints players
American people of Beninese descent
Sportspeople of Beninese descent
1999 births